Cucumber is a TV show produced by TVOntario in the 1970s, and repeated in the 1980s during TVOntario's daytime kids' programming.

The show's title was an acronym for Children's Underground Club of United Moose and Beaver for Enthusiastic Reporters. It featured a human-sized moose (played in costume by Alex Laurier) and beaver (Nikki Tilroe) living in a treehouse, and acting as amateur journalists as they present various educational segments on topics such as science or history. Segments were keyed to Ontario's elementary school curriculum, so that the show could be used as a teaching tool in schools.

By sending in a story or some artwork to the show (the mailing address was in Toronto), one could become a member of the Cucumber Club.

Guest stars
Some notable people appeared on the show:

John Candy guest starred as a character named Weatherman
Martin Short guest starred as a character named Smokey the Hare
An interview featured a nine-year-old Jeff Healey.

References

External links 
 

TVO original programming
Television series about journalism
Television shows filmed in Toronto
1972 Canadian television series debuts
1970s Canadian children's television series
Canadian television shows featuring puppetry